Bruce Charles Herbelin-Earle (born 7 July 1998) is an English-French actor and model, known for portraying the role of Marcus Greenbridge on the Netflix drama series Free Rein (2017–2020). He is signed to IMG Models.

Early life
Herbelin-Earle attended Imberhorne School.

Career
At the age of sixteen, Herbelin-Earle began looking at online casting calls, and auditioned for a role in the Disney Channel series The Lodge. Despite not getting the role, he was put into contact with an agent. Herbelin-Earle then auditioned for the role of Marcus Greenbridge in the Netflix drama series Free Rein, and as part of the process, he had to ride a horse, which he described as "terrifying". Talking about the audition to Wonderland, he stated that he had "no idea" about horse-riding, and that the other person auditioning for the role was "terrific" at it. He was told the day afterwards that he had gotten the role, which he portrayed until 2019. In 2018, Herbelin-Earle starred in and was the executive producer of a short film titled Wretched Things. Speaking about the decision to become the executive producer of the project, he said that he "wanted to more to be more involved with the project in an off-screen capacity", and that it "made it more like a collaborative project rather than me just coming in, doing my bit, and heading home". Later that year, he portrayed the role of Harry in the feature film 2: Hrs. Although he initially auditioned for the lead role, he stated that appreciated getting a role in the film regardless. Also in 2018, he appeared in an episode of the BBC medical drama series Casualty. In 2019, he starred in the Channel 5 miniseries 15 Days as Josh, alongside Free Rein co-star Freddy Carter. He described 15 Days as "great to film", and noted the "very different vibe" to Free Rein. In 2020, he is set to star in an episode of the Amazon Prime programme A Series of Light, which he cowrote.

Filmography

References

External links
 

1998 births
English male television actors
English male film actors
English male models
French male television actors
French male film actors
French male models
Living people
People from East Grinstead